Valerie Scott may refer to:
 Valerie Scott (tennis) (1918–2001), British tennis player
 Valerie Scott (alpine skier) (born 1967), British skier
 Valerie Scott (born 1958), Canadian sex worker and applicant in Canada (Attorney General) v. Bedford
 Valerie Scott, a fictional character in Land of the Giants